The 2016 Asics PSL Grand Prix was the second indoor conference of the Philippine Super Liga for its fourth season. The conference took place between October 8, 2016, and December 10, 2016. There was no men's tournament for this conference.

Teams

Women's division

Preliminary round

|}

All times are local Philippine Standard Time–(UTC+08:00)

|}

Play-offs
Top two teams received byes into the semifinal round.
The third ranked team will face the sixth ranked team in the quarterfinals. Likewise, the fourth ranked team will face the fifth ranked team.

Quarterfinals

|}

Semifinals

|}

5th place

|}

3rd place

|}

Final

|}

Final standing

Individual awards

Venues

Metro Manila venues
 Filoil Flying V Centre 

 Philsports Arena

PSL Spike on Tour venues

Broadcast partners
 TV5, AksyonTV, Sports5.ph 
 Solar Sports

References

2016 PSL season
PSL
PSL